Park Gyu-young (born July 27, 1993) is a South Korean actress. She is best known for her roles in the television series It's Okay to Not Be Okay (2020), Sweet Home (2020), and Dali & Cocky Prince (2021).

Early life and education 
Park Gyu-young was born on July 27, 1993, in Busan. She attended Busan Foreign Language High School and Yonsei University – Department of Clothing and Environment; she graduated from the latter in 2020.

Career 
Park began training to become an actor after she was scouted by JYP Entertainment in 2015, who saw her on the cover of a college magazine. She made her acting debut in Jo Kwon's music video "Crosswalk" in 2016. From 2016 to 2018, she played supporting roles in television dramas including Solomon's Perjury, Rain or Shine, and The Third Charm; she also appeared in the web dramas Magic School and Miss Independent Jieun. Park made her film debut in 2018 with the films Wretches and Love+Sling.

In 2019, Park appeared in the television dramas Romance Is a Bonus Book and Nokdu Flower in supporting roles. In August the same year, she left JYP Entertainment and joined Saram Entertainment. In 2020, she landed her first main role in a television series in the tvN drama It's Okay to Not Be Okay, appearing alongside Kim Soo-hyun and Seo Yea-ji. The same year, she appeared in Netflix's television series Sweet Home.

In 2021, Park starred in the mystery legal drama The Devil Judge as Yoon Soo Hyun, Kim Ga On's childhood friend who is now a police detective. Later the same year, Park joined the KBS drama Dali & Cocky Prince which was her first terrestrial lead role. The drama premiered in September 2021.

Filmography

Film

Television series

Web series

Music video

Awards and nominations

References

External links 
 
 Park Gyu-young at Saram Entertainment 
 
 
 
 

1993 births
Living people
21st-century South Korean actresses
JYP Entertainment artists
South Korean television actresses
South Korean film actresses
South Korean web series actresses
Yonsei University alumni
Actresses from Busan